The Lion is an epithet used to describe:

 Henry the Lion (1129–1195), Duke of Saxony and Duke of Bavaria 	
 Louis VIII of France (1187–1226), King of France
 Umur of Aydın (1309?–1348), Emir of Aydin
 William the Lion (c. 1143–1214), King of the Scots from 1165 to 1214
 Leo Cantor (1919–1995), American National Football League player
 Willie "The Lion" Smith (1893–1973), American jazz pianist

See also
 Robert III, Count of Flanders (1249–1322), the "Lion of Flanders"
 Ali Pasha of Ioannina (1740–1822), Ottoman pasha known as the "Lion of Yannina"
 Pierre Philippe Denfert-Rochereau (1823-1878), French colonel known as the "Lion of Belfort" for successfully leading the defense of Belfort during the Franco-Prussian War
 Philippe Pétain (1856–1951), French field marshal and leader of Vichy France known as the "Lion of Verdun"
 Sam "the Lion", a character in the 1971 film The Last Picture Show
 Richard I of England (1157–1199), King of England known as Richard the Lionheart

Lists of people by epithet